, abbreviated as , was one of the largest banks in the world during the latter half of the 20th century. Dai-Ichi Kangyo Bank was created in 1971 by a consortium of two banks: Dai-Ichi Bank, Japan's oldest bank, and Nippon Kangyo Bank, a state financial institution that granted long-term loans to industry and agriculture.

In 2000, it merged with Fuji Bank and the Industrial Bank of Japan to form Mizuho Financial Group. In 2002, DKB's corporate & investment banking division was transferred to Mizuho Corporate Bank, while its retail banking division was transferred to Mizuho Bank.

History

Dai-ichi Bank 

, originally Dai-Ichi Kokuritsu Bank (lit. First National Bank) was the first bank and the first kabushiki gaisha (joint share/stock company) ever to be established in Japan. Established by industrialist Shibusawa Eiichi in 1873, it was originally empowered to issue banknotes, until the Bank of Japan assumed this function in 1883. Subsequently, it became a purely commercial bank based in Tokyo.

In 1884, Dai-ichi Bank made a deal with the Joseon dynasty to make Dai-ichi Bank Korea Branch the monopoly agent of tariff management for the Choson. In subsequent years, Dai-ichi began issuing banknotes called “Dai-ichi Bank Token” in Korea, and became the de facto central bank of Korea. Following the Japan-Korea Protectorate Treaty of 1904, however, Dai-ichi was deprived of its privileges in Korea by the new colonial government, and reverted to being a conventional bank.

In 1943, Dai-ichi Bank and Mitsui Bank, a Mitsui zaibatsu company, merged to form Teikoku Bank (lit. Imperial Bank of Japan). Teikoku Bank was the largest bank in Japan in terms of assets when it was inaugurated. Teikoku Bank, however, couldn't expand its business freely due to Japan's involvement in World War II. Furthermore, former Dai-ichi employees and Mitsui employees didn't get along well because of the difference in corporate culture between them. As a result of deteriorating performance, Teikoku Bank was divided into two banks, the new Dai-ichi Bank and the new Teikoku Bank in 1948.

The new Teikoku Bank was renamed Mitsui Bank in 1954. It merged with Taiyo Kobe Bank to form Sakura Bank in 1990. Sakura Bank merged with The Sumitomo Bank in 2001 and is now Sumitomo Mitsui Banking Corporation.

Nippon Kangyo Bank 
 was founded in 1897 as a governmental institution providing long-term light industrial and agricultural loans under the Nippon Kangyo Bank Act of 1896. The Industrial Bank of Japan was also founded in 1902, providing long-term heavy industrial loans. Nippon Kangyo Bank had offices only in Tokyo and Osaka, leaving nationwide local services in the charge of its subsidiary Noko Bank (lit. Agricultural and Industrial Bank). Noko Banks were established in each prefecture, except for Hokkaidō (see Hokkaido Takushoku Bank).

In order to provide long-term loans, the bank's source of funds was not deposits but securities. The bank was also authorized to issue premium-bearing debentures. The bank financed, however, landlords and partnerships, and there were little money to go around individual farmers. In 1911 the Nippon Kangyo Bank act was amended so that Nippon Kangyo Bank could handle deposit accounts and offer short-term finance. In the latter of Taishō period the bank embarked on real estate investments, while Noko Banks were absorbed into Nippon Kangyo Bank one after another. The bank dramatically increased its scale of operations.

During World War II, Nippon Kangyo Bank was the lead management underwriter of war bonds for Japanese government. In reality, the war bond by Nippon Kangyo Bank was a lottery rather than a bond. Today's Japanese lottery (takarakuji) has its origin in this war bond.

After World War II, Nippon Kangyo Bank was privatized and became a commercial bank following the Nippon Kangyo Bank Repeal Act of 1950. The long-term banking division of Nippon Kangyo Bank was transferred to newly established Long-Term Credit Bank of Japan. The bank became popular among the public with the new rose logo, mascot named Nobara-chan (lit. Rose-chan) and advertising slogan .

Merger 
In 1971, Dai-ichi Bank and Nippon Kangyo Bank merged to form the Dai-ichi Kangyo Bank, Limited (“DKB”). DKB surpassed longtime leader the Fuji Bank as the largest Japanese bank measured by assets and deposit market share. DKB formed DKB Group (also known as Dai-ichi Kangyo Group), the largest Japanese keiretsu in terms of the number of associated companies, and became the central bank of DKB Group.

Taking over Nippon Kangyo and Noko's operation, DKB was the sole trustee of Takarakuji lottery, and was the only bank to have branches in every prefecture in Japan.

DKB executives worried about recurrence of the problem in their Teikoku Bank period, when the two former banks' employees were on bad terms each other. Therefore, they were particular about “a merger of equals.” DKB's board of directors, for example, was always composed half-and-half of former Dai-ichi members and former NKB members. The board of directors installed the former two banks members alternately as the next chairperson and president.

These practices backfired however, only causing difficulty among the employees similar to Teikoku Bank's case. Irrational personnel affairs prevented DKB from increasing revenue and profit. Although DKB had more assets than any other Japanese bank, its capabilities were inferior to high-performing banks such as Fuji, Sumitomo, Sanwa or Mitsubishi.

Scandal 

During the Japanese asset price bubble of the late 1980s, Japanese banks, including DKB, granted increasingly risky loans. Even worse, DKB financed not only high-risk companies but also Yakuza, in order to invest in capital resources more easily than its competitors. Furthermore, loans to sōkaiya (corporate racketeers) amounted to 30 billion JPY.

After the bubble's collapse, these bad loans were judged to be poor value for money. A raid by Tokyo prosecutors in 1997 impeaching of the loans to sōkaiya laid DKB open to public criticism. , former president and then chairperson of DKB, who faced severe pressure over a series of alleged misdeeds, committed suicide by hanging himself in his home.

DKB combined with Fuji Bank and the Industrial Bank of Japan in 2000, forming Mizuho Financial Group. In 2002, DKB's corporate & investment banking division was transferred to Mizuho Corporate Bank and its retail banking division to Mizuho Bank respectively.

Dai-Ichi Kangyo Credit Cooperative 
The Dai-Ichi Kangyo name remains in use by a Shinjuku, Tokyo-based credit union, which was founded as a credit union for Nippon Kangyo Bank employees during the Taisho era. It remains active in the Tokyo region with over 45,000 members, and uses a modified version of the Dai-Ichi Kangyo Bank branding.

Bibliography

References 

Banks established in 1971
Companies formerly listed on the Tokyo Stock Exchange
Companies formerly listed on the London Stock Exchange
Defunct banks of Japan
Mizuho Financial Group
Banks disestablished in 2002
Japanese companies established in 1971
Fuyo Group
Financial services companies based in Tokyo